Battlestar Galactica Collectible Card Game is an out-of-print collectible card game based on the Battlestar Galactica science fiction media franchise.  The game, published by WizKids, saw first release in May 2006 and was officially canceled in March 2007.

Game summary
Two or more players vie for influence in an attempt to win control of the Colonial Fleet. Player lose the game when their influence is reduced to zero, and wins the game either by achieving 20 influence or all opponents have lost.  Because it is possible for these conditions to be achieved simultaneously, ties may occur.  There is no limit on the number of players in a game.

Players primarily lose influence by failing to provide a defender when another player initiates a challenge, or by failing to respond to a Cylon threat.

Play sequence
Turns consist of three phases, with all players working through each phase before moving onto the next phase.  The phases are defined as follows:

 Ready Phase – During the ready phase, players ready and restore existing cards, draw two new cards, and may then play a card as a supply card or asset.
 Execution Phase – Players alternate playing a card, playing an ability, challenging, or resolving a mission.  When both players have passed consecutively, the phase ends.
 Cylon Phase – If the Cylon threat level of the face-up alert and reserve cards exceeds the fleet defense level, the Cylons attack.  When this occurs, each player reveals a Cylon threat, and each player must then challenge a threat or pass (losing one influence) until no threats remain or everyone has passed.

The player who goes first in all situations is the player with the lowest current influence at the start of the current phase.

Card types
 Bases – Cards which are not part of the main play deck.  Each player reveals a base card at the start of the game, and this card determines a number of factors, including starting hand size and influence.
 Events – Events which have an immediate effect on the game.
 Personnel – Individuals or characters from the universe of Battlestar Galactica.
 Missions – A task or mission which a player's fleet can attempt.  Players typically resolve missions by meeting the mission requirements using face-up alert units.
 Ships – Space-going vessels or ships from Battlestar Galactica.

Deck composition
Each player's deck must contain at least 60 cards, with no more than four copies of any one card.  Cards with the same title but different subtitles count as different cards.  Players must also supply a single base card, which does not count towards the 60-card minimum.

Products
Cards are available both in a two-player starter set and in booster packs.  The two-player starter set can be split to form two 31-card decks for two players, or can be used to make a single 61-card deck (removing the spare base card).  It includes a quick-start ruleset, a complete rulebook, and 62 fixed cards: 10 cards exclusive to the starter deck (5 are foil cards), and 52 others.

Booster packs contain 15 randomly selected cards: 11 commons, 3 uncommons, and 1 rare, with a one-in-four chance of a foil card being present.

Release history

Premiere
The premiere set of Battlestar Galactica: CCG was released on May 31, 2006 and contains 175 cards from the miniseries, season 1, and season 2:
55 Rares
55 uncommons
55 commons
10 fixed cards found in starter decks.

Betrayal
Battlestar Galactica: Betrayal was the first expansion set and was released on November 8, 2006.  It contains 165 cards (55 Rare, 55 Uncommon, 55 Common).  Betrayal was available in 15-card booster packs with an MSRP of $3.49.  Throughout the distribution, there are 500 hand-autographed rare "Crewman Cally" cards signed by actress Nicki Clyne.

Martial Law
Martial Law was an expansion set in development.  Wiz Kids announced on March 13, 2007 that they were discontinuing development of the expansion.

Concepts and comparisons to existing games
The Battlestar Galactica Collectible Card Game borrows a number of its game mechanics or concepts from existing collectible card games.  This includes:

 Assets / supply cards – The concept of any card being able to be used as a resource card instead of for its normal use.  This mechanic is used in games such as the Call of Cthulhu Collectible Card Game and the VS System.
 Mystic values – The concept of generating a random number by flipping a card from the top of the deck into the discard pile and consulting one of the fields on the card which was revealed.  This mechanic is used in games such as the original Star Wars Customizable Card Game by Decipher as well as the Legend of the Five Rings.
 Cylon attacks – The concept of a rogue enemy element in the game that is dangerous to all players is very similar to the Wanderer mechanic from Allegiance: War of Factions.
 Use of rounds instead of turns – This mechanic, where all players work through the same phase of the game simultaneously before proceeding to the next, has been used in a number of previous games, including Doomtown and Allegiance.

The general feel of the game is understandably similar to earlier science fiction games, most notably the Star Trek Customizable Card Game (which itself featured missions that could be completed by having the appropriate traits available).

Game cancellation
Officially announced on the Wizkids website on 13 March 2007, Battlestar Galactica CCG has been cancelled.

From the official announcement:

"We are sorry to announce that the next expansion for the Battlestar Galactica CCG, Martial Law, previously planned for February, will not be releasing. Although we diligently tried to extend this property into the CCG category, we are no longer able to maintain the product.

"It is important to us that you be aware of how much we have appreciated your support of the Battlestar Galactica CCG. We can only hope that you and your customers enjoyed our game half as much as we enjoyed creating it. Saying good-bye to any product like this one, into which we have poured so much of ourselves, is always difficult and we understand that you may have similar feelings. We are grateful for your dedication and we promise to continue to make more quality games in the future for you to enjoy.

"We apologize for any inconvenience that this cancellation may have caused, and we thank you in advance for your understanding."

Online play
Since this game is no longer in production, there has been a decrease in the number of players. For those who can not find others to play with in person, programs such as LackeyCCG allow players to meet and play online.

References

External links
Battlestar Galactica Collectible Card Game Website
BSG: CCG Card Gallery

Card Game Organizer Online for Battlestar Galactica: CCG
Belgium BSG.CCG site
LackeyCCG – Online game play

Battlestar Galactica games
Card games introduced in 2006
Collectible card games
WizKids games